Franco Bomprezzi  (1 August 1952 –  18 December 2014) was an Italian journalist and writer.

Born in Florence, Bomprezzi was born with osteogenesis imperfecta. Among other things, he was also chief editor for RAI, he worked for the newspapers Mattino di Padova" and Il Resto del Carlino, and was director of the journal DM and of the magazine Mobilità.  He appeared in the short-film Solo Cinque Minuti or Just Five Minutes with Valeria Golino. He was a member of Vodafone Italia Foundation's scientific committee and spokesman of the Ledha-League for the Rights of Persons with Disabilities. He received the Order of Merit in 2007.

References

External links 
Franco Bomprezzi's blog (In Italian)

Journalists from Florence
Italian male journalists
People with osteogenesis imperfecta
2014 deaths
1952 births